Madeleine Front (22 April 1930 – 26 December 2016) was a French alpine skier. She competed in two events at the 1956 Winter Olympics.

References

External links
 

1930 births
2016 deaths
French female alpine skiers
Olympic alpine skiers of France
Alpine skiers at the 1956 Winter Olympics
Sportspeople from Albertville
20th-century French women